Changxing or Changxingxian (长兴县) is a county in Zhejiang, China

Changxing may also refer to:

Places
Changxing Island, Dalian, or Changxingdao
Changxing Island, Shanghai, or Changxingdao (长兴岛)

People
 Xin Changxing (born 1963), Chinese politician and Communist Party Secretary of Jiangsu
 Lai Changxing (born 1958), Chinese businessman and entrepreneur
 Chen Changxing (1771–1853), descendant of the Chen Family and martial artist
 Zhou Changxing (1916–1994) , Chinese athlete

Transport
 Changxing railway station, a high-speed railway station
 Changxing South railway station, a railway station
 Xinyi–Changxing railway, a single-track railway line in eastern China
 Oushan Changxing, a compact multi-purpose vehicle

Other 
 Changxing dialect

See also
 Changting (disambiguation)
 Changxin (disambiguation)